Love at the Core is the second album from Run Kid Run, released on April 29, 2008.

Track listing
 "Rescue Me"- 3:30
 "Captives Come Home"- 3:44
 "Fall into the Light"- 2:36
 "One in a Million"- 3:32
 "Love at the Core" - 3:34
 "Sure Shot"- 3:20
 "My Sweet Escape"- 3:37
 "The Emergency"- 3:26
 "Set The Dial"- 3:46
 "Freedom"- 4:42

References 

2008 albums
Tooth & Nail Records albums
Albums produced by James Paul Wisner